Aliaksandr Shlyk (born 28 January 1974) is a Belarusian judoka.

Achievements

References

External links
 

1974 births
Living people
Belarusian male judoka